Otterburn Mill is a former textile mill in Otterburn, Northumberland, northeast England. It lies just south of the Otterburn Tower along the A696 road next to a bridge over the River Rede. It was owned by the Waddell family for many years and is over 250 years old.
The mill is noted for its pram rugs and its crowning moment was on the birth of Princess Elizabeth in 1926, when Buckingham Palace contacted the mill requesting a rug for the royal pram. Otterburn Mill is now a shop selling outdoor, country and lifestyle clothing for men, women and children. Rena's Country Kitchen is an onsite café. Much of the historic machinery can still be seen and the history of the Waddell family is showcased across the site.

History

Dating from the 18th century, Otterburn Mill was leased in 1821 to William Waddell. (Waddell, the son of a Jedburgh wool manufacturer, had recently arrived in the area having eloped across the border from Scotland with his young bride, Charlotte Ferrier). What began as a cottage industry grew, under successive generations of Waddells, into a factory-based operation as production became increasingly mechanised.

In the twentieth century, Otterburn Mill became 'a brand leader in woven cloths'; its distinctive tweeds were used by some of the leading fashion houses of Europe, including Dior, Balmain, Schiaparelli and Paquin. They were also popular for rural pursuits among the aristocracy and Queen Alexandra was a keen purchaser of the mill's wares.

By the 1970s the textile industry in Britain had gone into decline; manufacturing ceased at Otterburn in December 1976. Twenty years later John Waddell sold the buildings to Euan Pringle; they were converted into a shop selling outdoor and country clothing, with historic machinery and other items retained for display.

Gallery

References

External links
Official site

Otterburn, Northumberland